Archbishop Edward Joseph McCarthy (25 January 1850 – 26 January 1931) was a Canadian Roman Catholic priest and archbishop.

Born in Halifax, Nova Scotia, he was ordained to the priesthood in 1874. In 1906, he was appointed Archbishop of Halifax, Nova Scotia. He followed Cornelius O'Brien in this position. On 14 July 1910, he consecrated St. Patrick's Cathedral in Halifax, and in 1913 became vice-patron of the Catholic Emigration Association of Canada, an organization established to help maintain immigrants' links to Catholicism and to encourage them to settle close to others who spoke the same language as they.

External links
 Edward McCarthy, Pastoral letter addressed to the clergy and laity of the Diocese of Halifax (1915)
 Matteo SanFilippo, Roman Archives as a Source for the History of Canadian Ethnic Groups, (1991)]

1850 births
1931 deaths
Canadian people of Irish descent
20th-century Roman Catholic archbishops in Canada
Roman Catholic archbishops of Halifax